The 1992 Uzbek League season was the 1st edition of top level football in Uzbekistan since independence from the Soviet Union in 1992. 17 teams took part in the championship which was won by both Pakhtakor Tashkent and Neftchi Farg'ona whom finished the championship on 51 points and therefore shared the first ever Uzbek League title.

Pakhtakor Tashkent were also put forward to enter the first Commonwealth of Independent States Cup as league champions for the 1993 campaign.

Shahrixonchi Shahrixon, Kimyogar Olmaliq and Surkhon Termez were relegated

Teams
The League was contested by 17 teams, three of whom would be relegated.

League standings

Match results

Top scorer

References
Uzbekistan - List of final tables (RSSSF)

Uzbekistan Super League seasons
1
Uzbek
Uzbek